Cindy Duehring (August 10, 1962 – June 29, 1999) was an American activist and researcher. Duehring was the daughter of Donald and Jan Froeschle.  In 1985, while studying pre-med in Seattle, WA, Cindy was severely poisoned by a misapplication of pesticides in her apartment.  As a result of this contamination or intoxication  of an insecticide (against fleas) she eventually developed an Autoimmune disease.
She directed and founded the Environmental Access Research Network (EARN) which merged with the Chemical Injury Information Network (CIIN) in 1994.  Duehring received the Resourceful Woman Leadership Award in 1994 and the Right Livelihood Award in 1997.

References

External links
Chemical Injury Information Network website

See also
Multiple chemical sensitivity

1962 births
1999 deaths